Made-Up is a 2002 American comedy drama film directed by Tony Shalhoub and starring Brooke Adams and Shalhoub.

Cast
Brooke Adams as Elizabeth James Tivey
Lynne Adams as Kate James
Eva Amurri as Sara Tivey
Kalen Conover as Chris
Light Eternity as Molly Avrums
Jim Issa as Eli
Lance Krall as Simon
Tony Shalhoub as Max Hires
Gary Sinise as Duncan Tivey

Production
The film was shot in Lynne Adams' home in Boston.

Release
The film premiered at the Santa Barbara International Film Festival on March 2, 2002.  Then it was released in New York City on January 24, 2004 and had a limited release in Los Angeles on February 13, 2004.

Reception
The film has a 39% rating on Rotten Tomatoes based on 31 reviews.

Wesley Morris of The Boston Globe gave the film a negative review and wrote, "It wants, as Kate says about her documentary, to be a 'seminal work on beauty and aging.' But it wears like a gauzy romantic comedy."

Kevin Thomas of the Los Angeles Times gave the film a positive review, calling it "a comedy with lots going on and with considerable depth and complexity."

References

External links
 
 

Films shot in Boston